Ladies Man is an album by saxophonist Teddy Edwards which was recorded in 2000 and released on the HighNote label the following year.

Reception

In his review on Allmusic, Scott Yanow states "For this project, veteran tenor saxophonist Teddy Edwards performs ten songs named after women's names, including his own "Saskia." Despite the potentially gimmicky nature of the repertoire, the music is conventional hard bop ... this is an excellent outing, well worth exploring by straight-ahead jazz collectors"

Track listing 
 "Jeannie" (Duke Pearson) – 5:37
 "Rosetta" (Earl Hines) – 5:17
 "Ruby" (Heinz Roemheld, Mitchell Parish) – 6:06
 "Candy" (Alex Kramer, Mack David, Joan Whitney) – 4:21
 "Saskia" (Teddy Edwards) – 5:47
 "Diane" (Ernö Rapée, Lew Pollack) – 4:03
 "Donna Lee" (Charlie Parker) – 5:25
 "Marie" (Irving Berlin) – 6:08
 "Laura" (David Raksin, Johnny Mercer) – 6:22
 "Rosalie" (Cole Porter) – 5:08

Personnel 
Teddy Edwards – tenor saxophone
Eddie Allen – trumpet (tracks 1, 5, 7 & 8)
Ronnie Mathews – piano
Chip Jackson – bass
Chip White – drums

References 

Teddy Edwards albums
2001 albums
HighNote Records albums
Albums recorded at Van Gelder Studio